Elston is an unincorporated community in Cole County, Missouri, United States. It is located near the western boundaries of Jefferson City.

Elston was laid out in 1867, and named after A. M. Elston, a state politician.  A post office called Elston Station was established in 1858, the name was changed to Elston in 1877, and the post office closed in 1972.

References

Unincorporated communities in Cole County, Missouri
Jefferson City metropolitan area
Unincorporated communities in Missouri